Nicola Sanna (born 4 May 1963 in Bochum) is an Italian politician.

He is a member of the Democratic Party and he was elected Mayor of Sassari on 25 May 2014 and took office on 31 May.

See also
2014 Italian local elections
List of mayors of Sassari

References

External links
 
 

1963 births
Living people
Mayors of Sassari
Democratic Party (Italy) politicians